The Catholic World was a periodical founded by Paulist Father Isaac Thomas Hecker in April 1865.  It was published by the Paulist Fathers for over a century.  According to Paulist Press, Hecker "wanted to create an intellectual journal for a growing Catholic population, and insisted that it be a first-class publication in format, quality, and style, equal if not superior to any secular magazine in the country."

Early issues featured many articles by Orestes Brownson, including the May 1870 essay "Church and State", which described Brownson's understanding of the proper relationship between the Church and the state.

In the twentieth century, the magazine included commentary on political and religious events of the day, as well as fiction and poetry by Catholic writers.  The magazine was renamed New Catholic World in 1972, but reverted to its original title in 1989.  It ceased publication in 1996.

See also

Donahoe's Magazine
 Irish American journalism
List of theological journals

References

Further reading
 Gribble,  Richard. Guardian of America: The Life of James Martin Gillis, CSP (1998) online
 Gribble, Richard. "A Conservative Voice for Black Catholics: The Case of James Martin Gillis, CSP." Catholic Historical Review (1999): 420–434. in JSTOR
 Gribble, Richard. "The Other Radio Priest: James Gillis's Opposition to Franklin Delano Roosevelt's Foreign Policy." Journal of Church and State (2002): 501–519. in JSTOR

External links 
 Crisis Magazine article describing relationship between Hecker and Brownson in regards to the Catholic World 
 Online issues of the Catholic World from 1865 - 1922, with scans from the Making of America website and HathiTrust, and full-text transcriptions from Project Gutenberg

Catholic magazines published in the United States
Defunct magazines published in the United States
Magazines disestablished in 1996
Magazines established in 1865
Magazines published in New York City
Monthly magazines published in the United States